The Evangelische Nachrichtenagentur idea e. V. is a news agency based in Wetzlar. It products media "mainly about the Evangelical Movement and the evangelical assessment of church and secular processes" and also serves "the communication within the evangelical area".

References

External links 
 Official Website
 idea im Publizistischen Gesamtkonzept der EKD von 1997

News agencies based in Germany
Evangelicalism in Germany